Chrissie Mayr is an American stand up comedian and internet entertainer.

Biography
While in college she had an internship with the television show Late Night with Conan O’Brien.

She was the victim of swatting twice.

She has been on Amazon Prime's television show Comics Watching Comics and won in the fifth season.

She has also worked as a producer at various shows at comedy clubs.

She created Simpcast, a show on her YouTube channel, where she joins with Brittany Venti and other comedians to do a regular live group chat together.

Appearances
Fox network's shows Laughs and Punchline
The Wendy Williams Show
Reelz
The Chris Gethard Show
The Travel Channel
What Not To Wear
Gutfeld!
Compound Media
TimCast IRL 
America's Got Talent

References

External links 
 Official website 
 Chrissie Mayr - Twitter
 

American YouTubers
American podcasters
Social media influencers
American stand-up comedians
American women comedians
Comedians from New York City
Comedy YouTubers
Commentary YouTubers
Year of birth missing (living people)
Living people
21st-century American comedians
YouTube podcasters
YouTube vloggers